Neuquén is the capital city of the Argentine province of Neuquén and of the Confluencia Department, located in the east of the province. It occupies a strip of land west of the confluence of the Limay and Neuquén rivers which form the Río Negro, making it part of the ecoregion of Alto Valle del Río Negro. The city and surrounding area have a population of more than 340,000, making it the largest city in Patagonia.  Along with the cities of Plottier and Cipolletti, it is part of the Neuquén – Plottier – Cipolletti conurbation.

Founded in 1904, it is the newest provincial capital city in Argentina.

Etymology
The name of the city comes from the Neuquén River, which in Mapuche language means "water that has strength". This name was already used since 1884 for the federal territory. Since 1902, it was used for the railway station of the town, which at that time was a hamlet called Confluencia. The name of the town was officially chosen in 1904, when it was declared the capital of the territory. It is the only Argentine city that has a palindrome name, that is a word which reads the same backward as forward.

Economy
Neuquén is both an important agricultural center, surrounded by fertile lands irrigated by the waters of the Limay and Neuquén rivers in an otherwise arid province, and a petrochemical industrial center that receives oil extracted from different points of the province. It belongs economically and geographically to the Alto Valle region that produces apples, pears, and other fruits.

With the discovery of the Vaca Muerta oil fields west of the city (the third largest shale gas and oil reserves in the world), it has begun to experience a boom in real estate and construction. It is expected that over the next few years the city will experience unprecedented growth as it is the only significant city in the region. It has an airport, shopping centers, office space and institutions to become the center of the operations not only of the oil and gas companies, but also their suppliers.

Transport
National Route 22 (RN22) is the main road linking Neuquén with the rest of Argentina. Since 2021 it runs in eastern-western direction north of the city center through the Parque Industrial area, mostly as a four-lane motorway, linking the city with the Atlantic coast at Bahía Blanca to the East and Temuco (Chile), San Carlos de Bariloche and Zapala to the West and South-West. The former RN22, now called Avenida General Mosconi, a wide fast-transit avenue, runs in east-western direction through the southern part of the city center and divides the city into two halves.

The Tren del Valle commuter rail service links Neuquén with neighbouring Cipolletti and Plottier. Freight trains run to Bahía Blanca and Zapala.

Local transport consists of 30 bus lines, connecting most areas of the city, including Plottier and Las Perlas. The network is run by bus companies Ko-Ko and Empresa Tigre Iguazú. Additionally, several suburban lines connect the city with other cities and towns in the wider metro area, like Cipolletti, Centenario, Senillosa, General Roca and Villa Regina.

While the Río Negro and Río Limay are navigable, there are no port facilities in Neuquén and nearby cities. There was some commercial navigation in the Alto Valle area in the first half of the 20th century, but it has been abandoned since then.

History

The first inhabitants of the area were very mobile and moved according to the seasons of the year, climatic conditions, and the abundance of food and game.  Around the 16th century the people living in different areas of the province began to be assimilated by the Mapuche people. One of the most important trails used by the Mapuches passed through the area of the confluence of the Limay and Neuquén rivers.  

In the 17th century European explorers arrived in the area of the confluence. 

In 1604, Hernando Arias de Saavedra decided to explore the trails to Patagonia.  With the support of the ranchers of Buenos Aires, Santa Fe, and Corrientes, he departed from Buenos Aires and passed through the mountains of the Sierra de la Ventana. He reached what is now the city of Neuquén and continued on, possibly passing through what is today Auca Mahuida. 

In 1782, departing from Carmen de Patagones, Basilio Villarino traveled upstream on the Río Negro.  On 23 January 1783, he arrived at the confluence of the Limay and Neuquén Rivers, camping on an island. He then followed the Limay to the confluence of the Collón Curá, then from there to the Chimehuin River.

Neuquén as an Argentine Province
In 1885, the lands of what was at that time called Confluencia (i.e., "confluence," referring to the two rivers) were auctioned to a few people. Shortly after the Conquest of the Desert campaign conducted by the military over Patagonia, the Tehuelche and Pehuenche tribes that inhabited the province of Neuquén were either killed or pushed out of these lands.

Since there was no defined border with Chile, the Argentine government reached an agreement with the British-owned Buenos Aires Great Southern Railway company that was constructing a railway network, mainly in Buenos Aires Province, to build an extension to the town in exchange for lands, in order to populate it. In 1899, the railroad reached Cipolletti in Río Negro province, and three years later, after the construction of the bridge, arrived at Neuquén.

Neuquén was officially founded on 12 September 1904, and the capital of the territory was transferred from Chos Malal to the young town. The name "Neuquén" derives from the Mapudungun word nehuenken, meaning drafty, which the native people used in reference to this river.

By 1930, the town had only 5,000 inhabitants. In the 1960s, it acquired a new importance when oil deposits were found in the province by the state company YPF. The 1970s and 1980s saw massive demographic growth, accompanied by improvements such as the creation of the National University of Comahue in 1971.

In 2020, Sister Mónica Astorga Cremona, a Carmelite nun, founded Costa Limay Sustainable Complex for Transgender Women in Neuquén, the first permanent housing program in the world for transgender people.

Climate
Neuquén has an arid climate (Köppen BWk). During December and January, the mean temperature in these months is about  while in July, it reaches below . Being located far away from any major bodies of water, the thermal amplitude is high along with a large diurnal range, which indicates continental characteristics of the climate of the city.

Winds are moderately strong throughout the year, which favors evapotranspiration. Most of the wind comes from the west and the southwest, both of which occur 40–50% of the time. Mean daily sunshine hours range from a high of 11 hours/day in January to a low of 3 hours/day in June.

Museums and historical landmarks
There are cultural spaces housed in former railroad buildings from the early 20th century, such as the Gregorio Álvarez and the Paraje Confluencia museums and the Emilio Saraco Art Gallery. The more recently-built Museo Nacional de Bellas Artes, designed by Mario Roberto Alvarez, opened in 2004. The museum showcases both national and international artists. The building consists of four halls which include both the temporary and the permanent collection, as well as an auditorium and theater.

A variety of historical monuments dating from the 20th century, such as the Fotheringham Crossing Pyramid in the Sapere neighborhood, can be found throughout the city.

Sport

Neuquén hosted the 2001 FIBA Americas Championship, where the city's basketball fans supported Argentina's national basketball team to win the gold medal. All games were played in the 8,000 seat Estadio Ruca Che. At the 1995 FIBA Americas Championship, Neuquén acted as co-host.

Since 2015 Neuquén has hosted the FIM Motocross World Championship: its race track at Villa La Angostura was voted the best of the season in the two following seasons.

Sister cities
Neuquén is sister city, as designated by Sister Cities International with:

Knoxville, Tennessee, United States 
Treviso, Veneto, Italy
Valdivia, Chile

References

External links

  Municipality of Neuquén – Official website.
 

 
Capitals of Argentine provinces
Populated places in Neuquén Province
Populated places established in 1904
Cities in Argentina
1904 establishments in Argentina
Argentina
Neuquén Province